The 1995 World Orienteering Championships, the 16th World Orienteering Championships, were held in Detmold, Germany, 15–20 August 1995.

The championships had six events; the classic distance (formerly called individual) for men and women, the short distance for men and women, and relays for men and women.

Medalists

References 

World Orienteering Championships
1995 in German sport
International sports competitions hosted by Germany
August 1995 sports events in Europe
Orienteering in Europe
Sports competitions in North Rhine-Westphalia
1990s in North Rhine-Westphalia